Justice Boyle may refer to:

Larry Monroe Boyle (1943–2017), associate justice of the Idaho Supreme Court
Patricia Boyle (1937–2014), associate justice of the Michigan Supreme Court